George Washington (alternately titled George Washington as Master Mason)  is a public artwork by American sculptor Donald De Lue, located on the grounds of the Indiana Statehouse, in Indianapolis, Indiana, United States. The bronze statue of George Washington that occupies the Indiana Statehouse south lawn is one of several copies of a 1959 original wax cast at the Modern Art Foundry in Long Island, New York.

Description
The statue depicts Washington dressed in breeches with an apron and medallion decorated with Masonic symbols. Washington holds a tri-cornered hat in the crook of his proper left arm, and a gavel in his proper right hand. He wears an open overcoat with buttons and has a short podium to his proper right. Washington's attire depicts the first President as he may have looked when he laid the cornerstone for the U.S. Capitol in Washington, D.C. The sculpture is mounted upon a stepped, inscribed granite base. 

The base of the sculpture is inscribed with the following:

 Northwest corner of sculpture: Donald De Lue Sc. 1959
 Northeast corner of sculpture, east side, lower rear: The Modern Art Foundry, Inc. (Foundry mark) 1986 New York, New York
 Front/south side of base: GEORGE WASHINGTON PRESIDENT OF THE UNITED STATES/1789-1797; First in War, First in Peace, First in the Hearts of His    Countrymen
 West side of base: Observe good faith and justice toward all nations. Cultivate peace and/harmony with all. Religion and/morality enjoin this conduct./George Washington
 East side of  base:  My attachment to the Society of which we are members will dispose me to contribute my best endeavors to promote the honor and interests of the Craft./ George Washington, Freemason 1753–1799
 North side of base: (Masonic symbol, square and compass) Presented to the People of Indiana From the Freesmasons of Indiana/George Washington Commission/The Grand Lodge Free and Accepted Masons of the State of Indiana/May 19, 1987

The dimensions of the statue are as follows:  by   x . The Statehouse's version of De Lue's bronze statue was a gift of the Grand Lodge of Free and Accepted Masons of Indiana, dedicated May 19, 1987. This statue appeared at similar Masonic monuments in the following locations: 
 Detroit, Michigan (1966)
 Lansing, Michigan (1982)
 Lexington, Massachusetts
 Alexandria, Virginia (1966)
 Wallingford, Connecticut (1965)
 Flushing Meadows Corona Park, Queens, New York
 New Orleans, Louisiana (1959).

A  Smithsonian's Save Outdoor Sculpture survey completed in October 1992 noted the condition as 'well-maintained'.

Historical information
George Washington as Master Mason was sculpted initially from a wax mold at Donald De Lue's studio in Leonard, New Jersey, and copyrighted in 1959. This sculpture was re-cast in 1986 and dedicated May 19, 1987 by the grand master of the Freemasons of Indiana, J.C. Paxton of Warsaw, Indiana.  The total cost of the gift was $100,000.  Lieutenant Governor John Mutz accepted the statue on behalf of the state. George Washington as Master Mason was inspired by sculptor Bryant Baker's work, Illustrious Brother George Washington, which also depicts the subject in a similar pose with Masonic iconography.

See also
 Christopher Columbus (Vittori)
 List of statues of George Washington
 List of sculptures of presidents of the United States

References

External links

 Sculptor.org.

Outdoor sculptures in Indianapolis
Monuments and memorials in Indiana
Indiana Statehouse Public Art Collection
Outdoor sculptures in Michigan
Culture of Detroit
Monuments and memorials in Michigan
1959 sculptures
Bronze sculptures in Indiana
Statues of George Washington
Statues in Indianapolis
Sculptures of men in Indiana
Monuments and memorials to George Washington in the United States